Patrick Dante Ross Cunningham (born January 4, 1967) is a retired American football player who played in the National Football League from 1990 to 1998.  He was selected in the 4th round of the 1990 NFL Draft by the Indianapolis Colts.  He played for four teams in 80 games over 8 seasons. He later played three seasons in the Canadian Football League.

He went to college at Oregon State University and Texas A&M University.

Rick lives in Chandler, AZ.

References

1967 births
Living people
Players of American football from Los Angeles
American football defensive linemen
Sacramento City Panthers football players
Oregon State Beavers football players
Texas A&M Aggies football players
Indianapolis Colts players
Arizona Cardinals players
Minnesota Vikings players
Oakland Raiders players
American players of Canadian football
Canadian football defensive linemen
Montreal Alouettes players
Edmonton Elks players
Players of Canadian football from Los Angeles